= Julie Molé-Léger =

French actress, playwright and memoirist

Julie Molé-Léger (1767–1832), was a French stage actress, playwright and memoir writer. She is known for her memoirs, describing her life during the French Revolution. Her memoirs describe her life in exile in the Austrian Netherlands and the Dutch republic during the Reign of Terror.
